Greenburgh Central School District (GCSD) is a school district headquartered in Hartsdale, New York.

History
In 2014 Ronald O. Ross was the superintendent. Gary Stern of The Journal News wrote that Ross "has a history of stepping on toes while improving students' performance." That year was put on paid leave,  after district staff filed a lawsuit in federal court in regards to conduct they alleged Ross had done. Four months after the paid leave decision, the board terminated him.

Schools
 Woodlands Middle/High School (grades 7–12)
 Richard J. Bailey Elementary School (grades 4–6)
 Highview Elementary School (grades 2 and 3)
 Lee F. Jackson Elementary School (kindergarten and grade 1)
 Early Childhood Program (preschool)

References

External links
 Greenburgh Central School District

School districts in New York (state)